Mannaea (sometimes written as Mannea; Akkadian: Mannai, Biblical Hebrew: Minni, (מנּי)) was an ancient kingdom located in northwestern Iran, south of Lake Urmia, around the 10th to 7th centuries BC. It neighbored Assyria and Urartu, as well as other small buffer states between the two, such as Musasir and Zikirta.

Etymology of name 
The name of Mannaea and its earliest recorded ruler Udaki were first mentioned in an inscription from the 30th year of the rule of Shalmaneser III (828 BC). The Assyrians usually called Manna the "land of the Mannites", Manash, while the Urartians called it the land of Manna.

Describing the march of Salmanasar III in the 16th year (843 BC), it was reported that the king reached the land of Munna, occupying the interior of Zamua. However, the chronicle does not mention any march or taxation on the state of Mannaea. It is possible that the Assyrians either failed to conquer Mannaea, or advanced only to the border of Mannaea, and then changed course and marched on the neighboring country of Allarabia.

In the Bible (Jeremiah 51:27), Mannaea is called "Minni", and is mentioned with Ararat and Ashkenaz as some of the future destroyers of neo-Babylon. The Jewish Encyclopedia (1906), identified Minni with Armenia:

It can also relate to one of the regions of ancient Armenia, such as Manavasean (Minyas). Together with Ararat and Ashkenaz, this is probably the same Minni from the Assyrian inscriptions, corresponding to Mannea. The name "Armenia" has been theorized by some scholars as possibly deriving from "ḪAR Minni," meaning, the “mountains of Minni.”

According to examinations of the place and personal names found in Assyrian and Urartian texts, the Mannaeans, or at least their rulers, spoke a non-Semitic and non-Indo-European language related to Urartian, with no modern language connections.

Location
Their kingdom was situated east and south of the Lake Urmia.  Excavations that began in 1956 succeeded in uncovering Ziwiyeh and its branches the fortified city of Hasanlu, once thought to be a potential Mannaean site. More recently, another branch of Ziwiyeh, the site of Qalaichi  has been linked to the Mannaeans based on a stela with this toponym found at the site.

After suffering several defeats at the hands of both Scythians and Assyrians, the remnants of the Mannaean populace were absorbed by the Matieni and the area became known as Matiene. It was then annexed by the Medes in about 609 BC.

Ethnicity
According to the Encyclopædia Iranica:

According to the Archaeological Institute of America, 1964:

History
The Mannaean kingdom began to flourish around 850 BC. The Mannaeans were mainly a settled people, practicing irrigation and breeding cattle and horses.  The capital was another fortified city, Izirtu (Zirta).

By the 820s BC they had expanded to become the first large state to occupy this region since the Gutians, later followed by the unrelated Iranian peoples, the Medes and the Persians. By this time they had a prominent aristocracy as a ruling class, which somewhat limited the power of the king.

Beginning around 800 BC, the region became contested ground between Urartu, who built several forts on the territory of Mannae, and Assyria.  During the open conflict between the two, c. 750–730 BC, Mannae seized the opportunity to enlarge its holdings. The Mannaean kingdom reached the pinnacle of its power during the reign of Iranzu (c. 725–720 BC).

In 716 BC, king Sargon II of Assyria moved against Mannae, where the ruler Aza, son of Iranzu, had been deposed by Ullusunu with the help of the Urartians. Sargon took Izirtu, and stationed troops in Parsua (Parsua was distinct from Parsumash located further southeast in what is today known as Fars province in Iran.). The Assyrians thereafter used the area to breed, train and trade horses.

According to one Assyrian inscription, the Cimmerians (Gimirru) originally went forth from their homeland of Gamir or Uishdish in "the midst of Mannai" around this time.  The Cimmerians first appear in the annals in the year 714 BC, when they apparently helped the Assyrians to defeat Urartu. Urartu chose to submit to the Assyrians, and together the two defeated the Cimmerians and thus kept them out of the Fertile Crescent. At any rate, the Cimmerians had again rebelled against Sargon by 705 BC, and he was killed whilst driving them out. By 679 BC they had instead migrated to the east and west of Mannae.

The Mannaeans are recorded as rebelling against Esarhaddon of Assyria in 676 BC, when they attempted to interrupt the horse trade between Assyria and its colony of Parsuash.

The king Ahsheri, who ruled until the 650s BC, continued to enlarge the territory of Mannae, although paying tribute to Assyria.  However, Mannae suffered a crushing defeat at the hands of the Assyrians around 660 BC, and subsequently an internal revolt broke out, continuing until Ahsheri's death. Also in the 7th century BC, Mannae was defeated by the advancing Scythians, who had already raided Urartu and been repelled by the Assyrians. This defeat contributed to the further break-up of the Mannaean kingdom.

King Ahsheri's successor, Ualli, as an ally of Assyria, took the side of the Assyrians against the Iranian Medes (Madai), who were at this point still based to the east along the southwest shore of the Caspian Sea and revolting against Assyrian domination. The Medes and Persians were subjugated by Assyria. However, the Neo-Assyrian Empire, which had dominated the region for three hundred years, began to unravel, consumed by civil war after the death of Ashurbanipal in 627 BC. The upheavals in Assyria allowed the Medes to free themselves from Assyrian vassalage and make themselves the major power in ancient Iran at the expense of the Persians, Mannaeans and the remnants of the indigenous Elamites whose kingdom had been destroyed by the Assyrians. At the battle of Qablin in ca. 616 BC the Assyrian and Mannaean forces were defeated by Nabopolassar's troops. This defeat laid open the frontiers of the Land of the Manneans which fell under the control of Media between 615 BC and 611 BC.

See also

History of Iran
Median Empire

References

External links
Mannaean glazed bricks from Bukan

 
Ancient history of Iran
Ancient Near East
History of Azerbaijan (Iran)
Hurrians